"Thank God It's Friday" is a song written, produced and performed by R&B musician R. Kelly. It entered the UK charts at #14 in 1996. The accompanying music video was directed by Hype Williams.

Critical reception
British magazine Music Week rated the song three out of five, adding, "Smooth soul groove from the king of swing. Not a smash, but sparkling stuff all the same."

Charts

References

1996 singles
R. Kelly songs
Music videos directed by Hype Williams
Songs written by R. Kelly
Song recordings produced by R. Kelly
1995 songs
Jive Records singles